Events from the year 1959 in France.

Incumbents
President: Rene Coty (until 8 January), Charles de Gaulle (starting 8 January)
Prime Minister: Charles de Gaulle (until 8 January), Michel Debré (starting 8 January)

Events
8 January – Charles de Gaulle inaugurated as the first president of French Fifth Republic.
2 December – The Malpasset Dam collapses and floods the town of Fréjus, killing 412.

Arts and literature
11 March – Eurovision Song Contest held in Cannes.
29 October – Astérix the Gaul makes a first appearance in the first regular issue of the comic magazine Pilote.

Sport
25 June – 1959 Tour de France begins.
18 July – 1959 Tour de France ends, won by Federico Bahamontes of Spain, the first Spanish cyclist to win the Tour de France.

Births
1 January – Michel Onfray, philosopher and author
7 February – Christine Angot, novelist and playwright
18 March – Luc Besson, film director, writer and producer
1 May – Yasmina Reza, playwright, actress, novelist and screenwriter
14 May – Patrick Bruel, singer and actor
28 May – Steve Jeltz, baseball player
6 July – Richard Dacoury, basketball player
15 July – Christian Dornier, murderer

Deaths
21 January – Yves Le Febvre, writer and politician (born 1874)
17 April – Paul Dujardin, water polo player and Olympic medallist (born 1894)
23 June – Boris Vian, writer, poet and musician (born 1920)

See also
 1959 in French television
 List of French films of 1959

References

1950s in France